Dianne Claire Buswell (born 6 May 1989) is an Australian professional dancer. She is best known for her appearances on the British television show Strictly Come Dancing. After competing on Dancing with the Stars in Australia, she joined the British series in 2017, reaching the final in 2018 with her partner Joe Sugg.

Career 
Buswell is a former Australian Open champion and four-time Amateur Australian Open finalist. She and her brother Andrew Buswell were Western Australian Open Adult New Vogue champions for 2008 and 2010. She also appeared on So You Think You Can Dance Australia. 

Buswell turned professional at the age of 21 when she joined the touring dance company Burn the Floor in January 2011. In 2015, she was a professional dancer on the fifteenth season of Australia's Dancing with the Stars, paired with AFL star Jude Bolton; they were the fifth couple eliminated.

Strictly Come Dancing 
Buswell joined the BBC's Strictly Come Dancing in 2017. Her celebrity partner for the 2017 series was the Reverend Richard Coles. They were the second couple eliminated in the series, losing the dance-off to Simon Rimmer and Karen Hauer in a unanimous decision. Buswell was paired with television presenter Tim Vincent for the 2017 Children in Need special.

For the sixteenth series of the show in 2018, she was partnered with YouTuber Joe Sugg. They were runners-up, alongside Faye Tozer and Giovanni Pernice and Ashley Roberts and Pasha Kovalev, behind Stacey Dooley and Kevin Clifton. In early 2019, the couple performed in the Strictly Come Dancing Live! tour, winning 28 of the 29 shows.

Buswell returned for her third series in 2019, paired with radio DJ Dev Griffin. They were the third couple to leave the show, after losing a dance-off to Emma Weymouth and Aljaž Skorjanec.

For series 18 in 2020, she was partnered with The Wanted singer, Max George. They were the third couple to be eliminated, after losing a dance-off to Maisie Smith and Gorka Marquez.

Buswell returned for series 19 in 2021, partnered with Robert Webb, a comedian, actor and writer. Webb withdrew from the competition after three weeks, due to ill health.

In 2022, she was paired with radio and television presenter Tyler West for series 20. They were the eighth couple to be eliminated after losing a dance-off to Molly Rainford and Carlos Gu.

 
Highest and lowest scoring per dance

In the following tables,  indicates the couple(s) with the lowest score for that week.

Series 15: with Reverend Richard Coles

Series 16: with Joe Sugg

Series 17: with Dev Griffin

Series 18: with Max George

Series 19: with Robert Webb

Series 20: with Tyler West 

Notes
 Alfonso Ribeiro filled in for Tonioli
 Due to COVID-19 travel restrictions Mabuse had to be replaced with Anton du Beke for week 4 of Series 18.
 Webb withdrew from series 19 during week 4 for health reasons, thus the couple effectively finished in 13th place.
Tony Adams and Katya Jones were announced as the other couple in the bottom two. However, they did not compete in the dance-off due to Adams sustaining a hamstring injury, subsequently leading him to withdraw from the competition, and West to automatically advance to the next round.

Christmas Specials
In 2017, Buswell danced with football player and pundit Robbie Savage for the show's Christmas special. In 2019, Buswell partnered Joe Sugg in the Christmas special. In 2021, she was paired with maître d'hôtel and television personality Fred Sirieix for the Christmas special.

YouTube and other media work 
Buswell started a YouTube channel in March 2019, and in December of that year, she was named as the UK's most-subscribed new YouTuber of 2019, having gained almost 230,000 subscribers. In August 2020, Buswell launched a lifestyle channel, 'Buswellness', where she posts workouts and healthy recipes. 

Before becoming a professional dancer, Buswell was a hairdresser, and in January 2021, she began a podcast with BBC Sounds called 'Di's Salon', in which she chats to guests as they look back at the hairstyles they have had over the years.

In 2022, Buswell participated in the reality series Freeze the Fear with Wim Hof on BBC One.

Personal life 
Buswell was born in Bunbury, Western Australia. She began dancing at age 5, and went on to compete from an early age in State, National and International Ballroom and Latin events.

Buswell dated soap actor Anthony Quinlan from late 2017 to October 2018.

In late 2018, Buswell began dating Joe Sugg, her celebrity partner from Strictly Come Dancing. The couple confirmed that they were living together in August 2019. In February 2021, they revealed that they had bought a house together.

References

External links 
 
 Dianne Buswell on Instagram

1989 births
Living people
21st-century Australian dancers
Australian ballroom dancers
Australian YouTubers
People from Bunbury, Western Australia
Australian expatriates in England